The 1921 Hastings by-election was held on 4 May 1921.  The by-election was held due to the resignation of the incumbent Coalition Unionist MP, Laurance Lyon.  It was won by the Coalition Unionist candidate Eustace Percy.

References

1921 elections in the United Kingdom
1921 in England
20th century in Sussex
Hastings
By-elections to the Parliament of the United Kingdom in East Sussex constituencies